Jakarta is the capital of Indonesia and the largest city by population in Southeast Asia. The city is a blend as well as contrast of business districts with modern skyscrapers and kampungs with traditional Indonesian style architecture. Jakarta has architecturally significant buildings in a wide range of styles spanning distinct historical and cultural periods. Architectural styles reflect Malay, Javanese, Arabic, Chinese and Dutch influences.

In December 2019, there were 964 highrise buildings and 244 skyscrapers in Jakarta. The city has 127 completed skyscrapers with (150m+) height and another 52 more under construction. At present four supertall buildings (300m+) are being constructed in the city and another five supertall buildings are in proposal stage. Average age of the buildings of the city is about 8 years. Jakarta has more highrise buildings than that of Beijing. There are many other highrise and skyscrapers within Greater Jakarta outside DKI Jakarta, which are not included in this article. As of July 2021, there are 46 skyscrapers in Jakarta, which are taller than 200 meters. Jakarta has the highest numbers of 200-meter-plus skyscrapers among Southeast Asian cities. Seven 200-meter-plus skyscrapers were completed in 2015 in Jakarta, which was the highest among the cities in the world during that year. The city ranked third in the world by completing five 200-meter-plus skyscrapers during 2017.

The first high rise building in the city was Sarinah, which was built in 1963. The first building over 100m in Jakarta was Wisma Nusantara, which was built in 1967 and was the tallest building in Southeast Asia at that time Between 1983 and 1996, the tallest building in the city was Graha Mandiri. The first skyscraper above 250 meters height is Wisma 46 (262 m), which was constructed in 1996 and held the 'unbeatable' record of being the tallest building for nearly 20 years. As of October 2021, Autograph Tower is the tallest building and Indosiar Television Tower is the tallest structure in Jakarta, as well as in Indonesia.

Most of the tallest skyscrapers are located within the Golden Triangle of Jakarta, along main avenues such as Jalan M.H. Thamrin,  Jalan Jenderal Sudirman, Jalan Gatot Subroto and Jalan H.R. Rasuna Said. Clusters of high-rise buildings are located at SCBD, Mega Kuningan, Puri Indah, Kuningan Persada and along  T. B. Simatupang Avenue. The Golden Triangle of Jakarta is one of the fastest evolving CBDs in the Asia-Pacific region.

This list of tallest buildings in Jakarta ranks skyscrapers in the Special Capital Region of Jakarta. Skyscrapers of Greater Jakarta outside DKI Jakarta are not included in this list.

Tallest buildings 
This list ranks completed and architecturally topped out buildings in Jakarta with a minimum height of 150 meters based on standard height measurement. Highrises and skyscrapers of Greater Jakarta outside DKI Jakarta are not included in this list. This includes spires and architectural details but does not include antenna masts. The "Year" column indicates the year in which a building was completed.

Tallest under construction or proposed

Under construction
This list comprises highrise buildings that are under construction in Jakarta and are planned to rise at least 150 meters. Under construction buildings that have already been topped out are also included.

Proposed
This lists buildings that are proposed in Jakarta and are planned to rise at least 200 meters.

Timeline of tallest buildings
Buildings which were once held the title of tallest building in Jakarta, as well as the current one.

See also

List of cities with the most skyscrapers
 List of tallest buildings in Indonesia
 List of tallest buildings in Batam
List of tallest buildings in Surabaya
List of tallest buildings in Medan
 List of tallest structures in Indonesia

References

External links
 List of Skyscrapers at Emporis.com
 Diagram of Jakarta skyscrapers on SkyscraperPage
 Tallest buildings of Jakarta on Emporis
 Skyscrapers of Jakarta on CTBUH
 Pictures of jakarta's skyscrapers

Tallest, Jakarta

Structural engineering
Jakarta